The Big Town is a 1987 American drama neo-noir thriller film about a young man who comes to the big city to work as a professional gambler, in the process becoming romantically involved with two women—one of whom is already married. The film was directed by Ben Bolt and Harold Becker (uncredited) and it stars Matt Dillon, Diane Lane, and Tommy Lee Jones.

Plot
In 1957, J. C. Cullen is a small-town crapshooter who heads to Chicago, Illinois, to seek his fortune. There he becomes the pawn of two high-rolling professional gamblers, Mr. and Mrs. Edwards. He later gets mixed-up in a revenge scheme cooked up by Lorry Dane, the embittered stripper wife of strip-joint owner George Cole. Before he knows what's happened, Cullen is embroiled in two torrid romances: one with Dane and the other with nice girl Aggie Donaldson. He also nearly loses his life by ending up in the middle of a deadly feud between Edwards, Cole, and Phil Carpenter, the man Mr. Edwards accuses of causing him to lose his eyesight.

Main cast

Production
The film was based on the Clark Howard novel, The Arm, published in 1967. In October 1967 it was announced Peter Thomas would produce a film version of the novel from a script by Dennis Murphy for CBS Films. No film resulted. The novel was  published in paperback in 1970.

In 1986 producer Martin Ransohoff signed a three-picture deal with Columbia and Vestron Video, off the back of Ransohoff's success with Jagged Edge (1985). The first film he wanted to make was an adaptation of The Arm. Matt Dillon signed to star.

Ransohoff had previously made The Hustler, about pool sharks, and The Cincinnati Kid, about poker; The Arm was about dice. Ransohoff said, "I made The Cincinnati Kid 20 years ago and I was amused at the possibility of filling in a third - pool, poker and craps, they're sort of the three major areas of table gambling. This area of dice hadn't been dealt with." Ransohoff admitted he was unhappy with the title of the novel. "We're reviewing it because people are misled. Some people think it's a sequel to The Natural. Others think it deals with druggies. Whatever it's called, this could do it for Matt Dillon like Hustler did for Paul Newman and Cincinnati Kid for Steve McQueen."

Filming took place in Toronto, Canada. The original director was Harold Becker. He left the film during production and was replaced by Ben Bolt. Bolt was a suggestion of Columbia's new head of production, David Puttnam, who had started his job after the film had been greenlit.

Filming finished several weeks later than originally intended meaning Diane Lane had to miss out on a theatre job she had lined up.

Dillon said "it's not really about a kid but about growth. Umm, he's a small-town guy who outgrows the town. He's nocturnal, a gambler who shoots dice all night - but he's got a certain amount of naivete. He's naive. He's not a dark character, even though he lives in the dark. He's honest even though he doesn't make an honest living. He's got purity."

Reception

Critical
The film received a mixed reception.

The Los Angeles Times said the film "is so entertaining, so true to its period that it's easy to peg it as another '50s nostalgia piece when it actually possesses the kind of complexity usually associated with less commercial, less starry productions. It is very much in the spirit that former Columbia Pictures Chairman David Puttnam said he wanted to bring to Hollywood. The film also marks a terrific screen coming of age for Matt Dillon, who for the first time seems more man than boy, and it is a strong directorial debut for Ben Bolt... Robert Bolt. No element, however, is more impressive than Robert Roy Pool's superlative script." On Rotten Tomatoes, the film has an aggregated score of 50% based on 4 positive and 4 negative reviews.

Box office
The movie was not a box office success, earning less than $2 million.

References

Notes

External links
 
 
 

1987 films
1987 crime drama films
1987 thriller films
American crime drama films
American films about gambling
American romantic drama films
Films based on American novels
Films based on romance novels
Films set in 1957
Columbia Pictures films
Films set in Chicago
Films shot in Toronto
Films with screenplays by Robert Roy Pool
American neo-noir films
1980s English-language films
1980s American films